Jesse D. Auton (December 1, 1904 – March 30, 1952) was a brigadier general in the United States Air Force.

Early life
Jesse D. Auton was born on December 1, 1904 at Covington, Kentucky to Robert Wesley and Julia E. [Bagby] Auton. However, he was raised a few minutes to the south in Piner. There, he was the valedictorian of the 1923 graduating class of Piner High School.

World War II

Auton enlisted at Kentucky in 1928, going on to serve in the European Theatre of Operations during the Second World War. During the conflict he flew 12 combat missions.

At the White House, he served as an aide to President Franklin D. Roosevelt.

Death
Auton was killed on March 30, 1952 in a plane crash at Offutt Air Force Base, Omaha. He was on a flight returning from California. He was buried on Independence Day - July 4, 1952 at Arlington National Cemetery.

See also
 Eighth Air Force

References

External links
 Jesse Auton – Army Air Corp Library and Museum
 

1904 births
1952 deaths
United States Army personnel of World War II
Recipients of the Distinguished Flying Cross (United States)
United States Army generals
Recipients of the Air Medal
People from Pendleton County, Kentucky
Burials at Arlington National Cemetery